Homaloxestis xanthocharis is a moth in the family Lecithoceridae. It was described by Edward Meyrick in 1929. It is found in the Andaman Islands of India.

The wingspan is about 14 mm for males and 16 mm for females. The forewings are uniform light violet-fuscous. The hindwings are light grey, in males with a very large expansible ochreous-yellowish hair-pencil from the base of the dorsum beneath, lying alongside the abdomen and reaching its apex.

References

Moths described in 1929
Homaloxestis